The 1941 Allan Cup was the Canadian senior ice hockey championship for the 1940–41 season.

Final 
Best of 5
Sydney 8 Regina 6
Sydney 6 Regina 3
Sydney 1 Regina 1
Regina 5 Sydney 4
Regina 3 Sydney 2
Regina 3 Sydney 0

Regina Rangers beat Sydney Millionaires 3-2, 1 tie, on series.

External links
Allan Cup archives 
Allan Cup website

 
Allan Cup
Allan
Ice hockey competitions in Saskatchewan